Cyperus angustatus is a species of sedge that is found in both Papua New Guinea and Australia.

The species was first formally described by the botanist Robert Brown in 1810.

See also
 List of Cyperus species

References

angustatus
Taxa named by Robert Brown (botanist, born 1773)
Plants described in 1810
Flora of Papua New Guinea
Flora of Australia